The Fram women's handball team is the women's handball section of Icelandic multi-sport club Fram from Reykjavík. It currently plays in the Úrvalsdeild kvenna. It won both the national championship and the Icelandic Cup in 2018.

Trophies 
Icelandic Champions (23):
  1950, 1951, 1952, 1953, 1954, 1970, 1974, 1976, 1977, 1978, 1979, 1980, 1984, 1985, 1986, 1987, 1988, 1989, 1990, 2013, 2017, 2018, 2022
Icelandic Cup: (15):
 1978, 1979, 1980, 1982, 1984, 1985, 1986, 1987, 1990, 1991, 1995, 1999, 2010, 2011, 2018
Icelandic League Cup (5)::
 2010, 2013, 2015, 2016, 2017
Source

Team

Current squad 
Squad for the 2021-22 season.

Goalkeepers
 2  Sara Sif Helgadóttir
 5  Katrín Ósk Magnúsdóttir
 18  Ástrós Anna Bender Mikaelsdóttir
Wingers
RW
 14  Þórey Rósa Stefánsdóttir
 4  Daðey Ásta Halfdánsdóttir
LW
 7  Karólína Bæhrenz Lárudóttir
 15  Harpa María Friðgeirsdóttir
 17  Unnur Ómarsdóttir
Line players
 11  Svala Júlía Gunnarsdóttir
 19  Elva Þóra Arnardóttir
 21  Steinunn Björnsdóttir
 22  Jónína Hlín Hansdóttir
 24  Perla Ruth Albertsdóttir

Back players  
 8  Kristrún Steinþórsdóttir
 9  Ragnheiður Júlíusdóttir
 16  Stella Sigurðardóttir
 23  Lena Margrét Valdimarsdóttir
CB
 6  Guðrun Erla Bjarnadóttir
 10  Karen Knútsdóttir
 13  Erna Guðlaug Gunnarsdóttir
RB
 20  Hildur Þorgeirsdóttir
 25  Margrét Björg Castillo

References

External links
 Official site
 Club profile at hsi.is

Sport in Reykjavík
Fram (handball)